This is a list of newspapers in Panama.

Newspapers 
Crítica - website
Día a Día - website
La Estrella de Panamá
Mi Diario
Panamá América - website
La Prensa
El Siglo

See also

Media of Panama

Further reading

External links
 

Panama
Newspapers in Panama